Fiona Banner (born 1966), also known as The Vanity Press is a British artist. Her work encompasses sculpture, drawing, installation and text, and demonstrates a long-standing fascination with the emblem of fighter aircraft and their role within culture and especially as presented on film. She is well known for her early works in the form of 'wordscapes', written transcriptions of the frame-by-frame action in Hollywood war films, including Top Gun and Apocalypse Now. Her work has been exhibited in prominent international venues such as the Museum of Modern Art, New York and Hayward Gallery, London.  Banner was shortlisted for the Turner Prize in 2002.

Life 

Fiona Banner was born on Merseyside, North West England in 1966. She studied at Kingston University and completed her MA at Goldsmiths College of Art in 1993. The next year she held her first solo exhibition at City Racing. Since graduating from Goldsmiths College of Art, Banner has continued to evolve an important, considered and interrelated practice, rooted in language. Publishing, in the broadest sense, is central to her practice.

In 1995, she was included in General Release: Young British Artists held at the XLVI Venice Biennale.

Since 1994 Banner has created handwritten and printed texts - 'wordscapes' - that retell in her own words entire feature films, including Point Break (1991) and The Desert (1994), or particular scenarios in detail. Her work took the form of solid single blocks of text, often the same shape and size as a cinema screen. She also investigates the formal components of written language, giving significance to the symbols that punctuate sentences.

In 1997, when she published THE NAM, she started working under the imprint of The Vanity Press, and has since published an extensive archive of books, objects and performances, many questioning the notion of authorship and copyright. For Banner, the act of publishing is itself a performative one. Consequently, her work resits traditional notions of grandeur and exclusivity, instead deploying a pseudo formality that is playful and provocative. THE NAM  is a 1,000-page book which describes the plots of six Vietnam films in their entirety: the films are Apocalypse Now, Born on the Fourth of July, The Deer Hunter, Full Metal Jacket, Hamburger Hill and Platoon.

Since early 2000, Banner has been working with pornographic film as a basis for an exploration of our obsession with sex, and the extreme limits of written communication. In large, densely filled works she transcribe the varied sexual activities taking place in Asswoman in Wonderland, starring Tiffany Minx, who also directed this X-rated version of Alice's fictional adventures. Banner's own Arsewoman in Wonderland (2001), presented in the Turner Prize exhibition, is a 4 x 6 m printed description of the film pasted and layered sheet after sheet onto the wall like and overladen billboard. 'I wanted to make some work about sex but I couldn't describe it. I was too close to it and I did not have the words that close to hand. I looked again at ports as a way of investigating my own taboo. Just as with the war films I enjoyed it but found it hard to grasp; it was intimate yet distant, seductive yet sometimes repulsive. My response to the film was very emotional.'  The Guardian asked, "It's art. But is it porn?" calling in "Britain's biggest porn star", Ben Dover, to comment. The prize was won that year by Lancastrian artist Keith Tyson.

In 2009 she issued herself an International Standard Book Number and registered herself as a publication under her own name.

In 2010, she was selected to create the 10th Duveen Hall commission at Tate Britain for which she transformed and displayed two decommissioned Royal Air Force fighter jets.

On 1 October 2010, in an open letter to the British government's culture secretary Jeremy Hunt—co-signed by a further 27 previous Turner prize nominees, and 19 winners—Banner opposed any future cuts in public funding for the arts. In the letter the cosignatories described the arts in Britain as a "remarkable and fertile landscape of culture and creativity."

Banner’s work includes sculpture, drawing and installation; text is the core of her oeuvre. She is one of the "key names", along with Jake and Dinos Chapman, Gary Hume, Sam Taylor-Wood, Tacita Dean and Douglas Gordon, of the Young British Artists.

Other works 

- Onyx, Bookman, Courier 2018 Full stop inflatables (Installation Breeder, Athens)

- SS19 The Walk (and Buoys Boys) 2018 High definition digital film (Installation Breeder, Athens)

- SS19 The Walk 2018 Performed at DRAFx: An Evening of Performances (o2 Kentish Town Forum, London)

- Buoys Boys 2016, Full Stop inflatables, Sculptural performance (De La Warr Pavilion, Bexhill-on-sea)

- Buoys Boys 2016, High definition digital film

- STAMP OUT PHOTOGRAPHIE 2014 (V-A-C collection Whitechapel Gallery, London)

- 1066 2012 Wall projection (Turner Contemporary, England)

- The Exquisite Corpse Will Drink the Young Wine 2012 Musical Performance / Screening (The Welsh Congregational Chapel, Borough, London)

- Performance Nude 2010 Performance with David Salas (Claire de Rouen / Other Criteria Book Launch, London)

- Mirror 2007 Performance with Samantha Morton (Whitechapel Gallery, London)

Exhibitions 

1994

- Pushing Back The Edge Of The Envelope, City Racing, London

1995

- Viewing Room, Luhring Augustine Gallery, New York

1997

- The Nam - 1000 page all text flick book, London

- Only the Lonely, Frith Street Gallery, London

1998

- Art Now, Tate Britain, London

- LOVE DOUBLE, Barbara Thumm Gallery, Berlin

1999

- Statements, Basel Art Fair

- ASTERISK, Gesellschaft für Aktuelle Kunst, Bremen

- Don't Look Back, Brooke Alexander, New York

- THE NAM and Related Material, Printed Matter, New York

- STOP, Frith Street Gallery, London

2000

-Soixante-Neuf, Charles H Scott Gallery, Emily Carr Institute, Vancouver

2001

- ARSEWOMAN, Murray Guy, New York

- ARSEWOMAN, Barbara Thumm Gallery, Berlin

- Rainbow, 24/7, Hayward Gallery, London

2002

- My Plinth is Your Lap, Neuer Aachener Kunstverein, Aachen

- My Plinth is Your Lap, Dundee Contemporary Arts, Dundee

2003

- Fiona Banner, 1301PE, Los Angeles, CA

2006

- Arsenal, Barbara Thumm Gallery, Berlin

- Arsewoman in Wonderland, Barbara Thumm Gallery, Berlin

2007

- Peace On Earth, Tate Britain, London  

- Every Word Unmade, Barbara Thumm Gallery, Berlin

- The Bastard Word, Power Plant, Toronto

2010

- The Naked Ear, Frith Street Gallery, London

- Harrier and Jaguar, Tate Britain Duveens Commission 2010, Tate Britain, London

- Tornado, Co-commission by Locus+ and Great North Run Culture, 2010, Newcastle

- All the World's Fighter Planes, Musée d'art de Joliette, Québec

2011

- Snoopy Vs The Red Baron, Barbara Thumm Gallery, Berlin

2012

- Unboxing, The Greatest Film Never Made, 1301PE, Los Angeles

2013

- The Vanity Press, Summerhall, Edinburgh (Catalogue)

2014

- Wp Wp Wp, Yorkshire Sculpture Park, Wakefield

- Mistah Kurtz, He Not Dead, PEER, London

2015

- Scroll Down And Keep Scrolling, Ikon Gallery, Birmingham, UK

- FONT, Frith Street Gallery, London

2016

- Au Cœur des Ténèbres, mfc-Michele Didier, Paris, France

- Buoys Boys, De La Warr Pavilion, Bexhill, UK

- Fiona Banner, Barbara Thumm Gallery, Berlin

- Scroll Down And Keep Scrolling, Kunsthalle Nürnberg, Germany

- Fiona Banner, 1301PE, Los Angeles

- Study #13. Every Word Unmade, Fiona Banner, David Roberts Art Foundation, London

2017

- Runway AW17, De Pont Museum, Tilburg, Netherlands

2018

- Buoys Boys, Mission Gallery, Swansea, Wales

2019

- Fiona Banner aka The Vanity Press, Libby Leshgold Gallery, Emily Carr University of Art and Design, Vancouver, Canada

- Fiona Banner aka The Vanity Press, Independent Art Fair, Barbara Thumm Gallery, New York, USA

- Full Sea Stop Scape, Barbara Thumm Gallery, Berlin, Germany

2020

- PERIOD, Museum Voorlinden, Netherlands

2021

- Pranayama Typhoon, Barakat Contemporary, Seoul, Korea

References

External links
 Fiona Banner – Fiona Banner's own website with some artworks, texts and exhibition news
The Vanity Press
 The Body Of The Text – Fiona Banner article in Art in America
 Fiona Banner Profile on BBC site
 Interview with Fiona Banner
 Fiona Banner at Frith Street Gallery
 Fiona Banner at De Pont museum

1966 births
Living people
20th-century English women artists
21st-century English women artists
Alumni of Goldsmiths, University of London
Alumni of Kingston University
English contemporary artists
English installation artists
English sculptors
English women sculptors
Young British Artists